The Elephant in the Living Room is an American documentary film about the topic of exotic pets kept in homes in the United States and about the controversy surrounding this topic.

Plot
Praised by critics as one of the best films of the year, The Elephant in the Living Room takes viewers on a journey deep inside the controversial American subculture of raising the world's most dangerous animals as household pets. Set against the backdrop of a heated national debate, the documentary chronicles the extraordinary story of two men at the heart of the issue – Tim Harrison, an Ohio police officer whose friend was killed by an exotic pet, and Terry Brumfield, a big-hearted man who struggles to raise two African lions that he loves like his own family. In the first of many unexpected twists, the lives of these two men collide when Terry's male lion escapes its pen and is found attacking cars on a nearby highway.

Awards
 2010 "Best Documentary" – Sedona International Film Festival
 2010 "Best Documentary" – The United Film Festivals (London)
 2010 "Best Documentary" – Burbank International Film Festival
 2010 "Best Documentary" – Traverse City Film Festival
 2011 "Best Documentary" – Genesis Award

See also
 List of documentaries

References

External links
 
 
 

American documentary films
Culture of Dayton, Ohio
Documentary films about animal rights
2010 films
2010 documentary films
2010s English-language films
2010s American films